David Myers (31 July 1971 – 20 October 2008) was an English professional rugby league footballer who played in the 1980s and 1990s.

Background
David Myers was born in Widnes, Cheshire, England on 31 July 1971. He played junior rugby league for Blackbrook before turning professional, joining Widnes in August 1988.

Playing career
Myers made his senior debut for Widnes in February 1989, scoring a hat trick against Oldham. He made eight appearances for the club during the 1988–89 season.

In August 1989, Myers was the subject of a contract dispute between Widnes and Warrington, with both clubs claiming they had signed the player. The Rugby Football League ruled in favour of Warrington, with an independent tribunal setting the transfer fee at an initial £35,000, potentially rising to £80,000 depending on future appearances. Myers made six appearances for Warrington during the 1989–90 season, but was transfer listed in February 1990 after failing to impress at the club.

Myers joined Wigan, scoring a try on his debut against Sheffield Eagles in September 1990. He played and scored in Wigan's 13-8 victory over St. Helens in the 1991 Challenge Cup Final during the 1990–91 season at Wembley Stadium, London on Saturday 27 April 1991, and played , i.e. number 2, when Joe Lydon missed the game due to injury, and scored a try in the defending champions Wigan's 21-4 victory over the visiting Penrith Panthers in the 1991 World Club Challenge during the 1991–92 season at Anfield, Liverpool on Wednesday 2 October 1991, Shaun Edwards intercepting in his own half and giving the ball to Myers a few yards from the try line. Myers had been picked ahead of Mark Preston by coach John Monie, but ended scoring only half the amount of tries Preston had. 

Following the arrival of Martin Offiah, Myers was dropped at Wigan, but was nevertheless selected during the 1992 Great Britain Lions tour of Australia and New Zealand as a replacement for injured players but failed to play in any significant games. In October 1992, he was sold to Widnes in an exchange deal which saw Paul Atcheson join Wigan from Widnes.

Myers switched codes to rugby union later in his career, representing Widnes RUFC. He eventually moved into coaching, and was the assistant coach at Bowdon Rugby Club at the time of his death.

Death
Myers died aged 37 in a car accident on the M6 motorway in Sandbach, Cheshire, England. It was confirmed in a coroner's report that Myers was using steroids and amphetamines whilst driving, and died of a heart attack, although the report also concluded that the two drugs had contributed to this.

References

External links

1971 births
2008 deaths
Bradford Bulls players
English rugby league players
Great Britain under-21 national rugby league team players
Manly Warringah Sea Eagles players
Road incident deaths in England
Rugby league players from Widnes
Rugby league wingers
Salford Red Devils players
Wakefield Trinity players
Warrington Wolves players
Western Suburbs Magpies players
Widnes Vikings players
Wigan Warriors players